Vanessa Ferlito is an American actress. She is known for playing Detective Aiden Burn in the first season of the CBS crime drama CSI: NY, as well as for her recurring portrayal of Claudia Hernandez in FOX drama 24, and for her starring roles as FBI Agent Charlie DeMarco in the USA Network series Graceland and as Tammy Gregorio on the CBS crime drama series NCIS: New Orleans. She has also appeared in a number of films, including Spider-Man 2 (2004), Shadowboxer (2005), Man of the House (2005), Gridiron Gang (2006), Death Proof (2007), Nothing like the Holidays (2008), Madea Goes to Jail (2009), Julie & Julia (2009), Wall Street: Money Never Sleeps (2010), and Stand Up Guys (2012).

Personal life
Ferlito was born to an Italian-American family in Brooklyn, New York. Her father died of a heroin overdose when she was two years old. Her mother and stepfather own a hair salon in Brooklyn. Before becoming an actress, Ferlito was a Wilhelmina model, and a New York City "club kid". Ferlito is a single mother who gave birth to a son in September 2007.

Career

Ferlito developed acting aspirations early in her life and broke into the entertainment business through a series of guest spots and recurring roles.

In 2003, Ferlito starred as Lizette Sanchez in John Leguizamo's boxing drama Undefeated, which earned her an NAACP nomination for Outstanding Actress in a TV movie. This was followed in 2004 by a role in Spider-Man 2. In 2005 Ferlito appeared in Stephen Herek's Man of the House, opposite Tommy Lee Jones, for which she received positive notice, with Variety's Joe Leydon stating that "Vanessa Ferlito is the standout, mainly because she’s the only one who gets enough to do to make a strong impression as a distinctive personality."

On the small screen, Ferlito was a series regular on the first two seasons (2004–2005) of CBS's CSI: NY, as Aiden Burn, a member of the forensic investigation team led by Gary Sinise. Ferlito has also appeared in other television series, including HBO’s The Sopranos, NBC’s Law & Order and Third Watch, and had a recurring role as Claudia in FOX's series 24.

After CSI: NY, Ferlito starred in several films, among them Wall Street: Money Never Sleeps; Nora Ephron's Julie & Julia opposite Meryl Streep, Stanley Tucci and Amy Adams; Tyler Perry's Madea Goes to Jail; and Alfredo De Villa’s Nothing like the Holidays (originally titled Humboldt Park) with Alfred Molina, John Leguizamo and Jay Hernandez. Prior to these, Ferlito appeared in Quentin Tarantino’s Death Proof opposite Kurt Russell, a role Tarantino wrote specifically for Ferlito. She also appeared in Lee Daniel's Shadowboxer with Helen Mirren and Cuba Gooding Jr.

In 2012, Ferlito was cast in the feature film, Stand Up Guys, opposite Al Pacino, Christopher Walken and Alan Arkin. She also played Charlie DeMarco on USA Network's Graceland, which ran between 2013 and 2015. In 2016, Ferlito was added to the cast of NCIS: New Orleans for the show's third season, playing an FBI special agent who is sent from DC to investigate the NCIS team.

Filmography

Film

Television

References

External links

 

Actresses from New York City
American film actresses
American television actresses
American people of Italian descent
Living people
People from Brooklyn
21st-century American actresses
Year of birth missing (living people)